Tobias Rieder (born 10 January 1993) is a German professional ice hockey forward who is currently playing for Växjö Lakers of the Swedish Hockey League (SHL). Rieder was originally selected by the Edmonton Oilers in the fourth round, 114th overall, of the 2011 NHL Entry Draft, and made his NHL debut in 2014–15 with the Arizona Coyotes. He has also previously played with the Los Angeles Kings, Edmonton Oilers, Calgary Flames and Buffalo Sabres.

Playing career
Having been drafted by the Edmonton Oilers in the 2011 NHL Entry Draft on 29 March 2013, Rieder's playing rights were traded to the Phoenix Coyotes in exchange for Kale Kessy. At the conclusion of his major junior career in the 2012–13 season with the Kitchener Rangers of the Ontario Hockey League (OHL), on 15 April 2013, Rieder signed a three-year, entry-level contract with Phoenix.

In the 2014–15 season, his second professional campaign in North America, Rieder received his first NHL recall by the Coyotes from the club's American Hockey League (AHL) affiliate, the Portland Pirates, on 2 November 2014. That same day, he scored his first NHL goal, the game-winner for the Coyotes.

On 1 December 2014, Rieder set an NHL record for a first-year player by scoring two shorthanded goals 58 seconds apart during the same penalty kill in a 5–2 win against the Edmonton Oilers.

On 21 February 2018, during the 2017–18 season, Rieder (along with goaltender Scott Wedgewood) was traded to the Los Angeles Kings in exchange for goaltender Darcy Kuemper. In the final stretch of the regular season, Rieder appeared in 20 games with the Kings, scoring four goals and six points. He made his Stanley Cup playoff debut in Los Angeles' first-round sweep to the Vegas Golden Knights.

On 1 July 2018, as a free agent, Rieder returned to the Edmonton Oilers organization after signing a one-year, $2 million contract. Signing with the Oilers with the lofty ambition to play alongside countryman Leon Draisaitl, Rieder was unable to contribute early in the 2018–19 season, finding himself in a bottom six checking-line role. Failing to register a goal with the Oilers after 60 games, Rieder was singled out publicly by Oilers CEO Bob Nicholson, stating their intention not to sign him after the season, on which Nicholson later apologized. Rieder completed the season with a career-low 11 assists in 67 games.

On 25 June 2019, Rieder was not tendered a qualifying offer from the Oilers, releasing him as a free agent. On 4 September 2019, Rieder was invited to a professional tryout agreement with the Calgary Flames. On 27 September 2019, after a successful pre-season, he was signed to a one-year, two-way contract with the Flames.

On 16 August 2020, Rieder scored his third shorthanded goal of the 2020 Stanley Cup playoffs in Game 4 against the Dallas Stars, tying an NHL record for most shorthanded goals in one playoff season. Rieder joins the list alongside Derek Sanderson, Bill Barber, Lorne Henning, Wayne Gretzky, Wayne Presley, and Todd Marchant. He finished with 5 points in 10 post-season games.

As a free agent from the Flames, Rieder was signed by the Buffalo Sabres on a one-year, $700,000 contract on 9 October 2020.

Leaving the Sabres at the conclusion of his contract, as a free agent approaching the  season, Rieder accepted an invitation to attend the Anaheim Ducks training camp on a Professional Try-out basis on 15 September 2021.

International play
Rieder was named to the Germany men's national ice hockey team and made his senior debut at the 2014 IIHF World Championship.

On 25 January 2022, Rieder was selected to play for Team Germany at the 2022 Winter Olympics.

Career statistics

Regular season and playoffs

International

References

External links
 

1993 births
Living people
Arizona Coyotes players
Buffalo Sabres players
Calgary Flames players
Edmonton Oilers draft picks
Edmonton Oilers players
Expatriate ice hockey players in Canada
Expatriate ice hockey players in the United States
EV Landshut players
German expatriate sportspeople in Canada
German expatriate sportspeople in the United States
German ice hockey right wingers
Kitchener Rangers players
Los Angeles Kings players
Ice hockey players at the 2022 Winter Olympics
Olympic ice hockey players of Germany
Portland Pirates players
Sportspeople from Landshut
Växjö Lakers players
German expatriate ice hockey people
Expatriate ice hockey players in Sweden
German expatriate sportspeople in Sweden